In Mandaeism, ṣauma is a term that means fasting. Although ṣauma can refer to physical fasting, it is more often used in Mandaeism to refer to spiritual piety and abstaining from sin.

On some days of the Mandaean calendar, Mandaeans perform light fasting. Unlike the Islamic tradition of sawm during Ramadan, Mandaeans do not completely forgo food and water for long periods of time. Instead, Mandaeans typically perform light fasting, such as abstaining from meat during certain mbaṭṭal (ominous) days.

Spiritual fasting
The Mandaic term Ṣauma Rabba refers to a kind of "spiritual fasting" in which devout Mandaeans do not partake in the vices of the world and abstain from performing sinful activities.

The precepts of the Ṣauma Rabba, which exemplify the Mandaean tenets of pacificism, are mentioned in Book 1 and Book 2, Chapter 1 of the Right Ginza. Both have eight precepts that are identified with different parts of the body.

See also
Ta'anit, or fasting in Judaism
Fasting in Christianity
Fasting in Islam, or sawm
Ten Commandments
Noble Eightfold Path in Buddhism

References

Fasting
Mandaeism
Mandaic words and phrases
Codes of conduct
Religious ethics